The Mule is a 2013 film based on the novel by Juan Eslava Galán which stars Mario Casas and María Valverde alongside Secun de la Rosa. An infamous litigation about its finances erupted in the last days of shooting in October 2009, pitting British director, co-writer, and producer Michael Radford against Spanish producer Alejandra Frade. A theatrical cut, with Radford having cut ties to it, was eventually released in 2013.

Plot 
Starting in the last stages of the Spanish Civil War, the plot follows the mishaps of Rebel faction corporal Juan Castro, who finds a mule in the battlefield. Having the mule and 400 ₧, Castro tries to woo love interest Conchi.

Cast

Production 
The film was originally developed as an international co-production between Madrid's Gheko Films, Andalusia's Gheko Films Sur, Britain's Workhorse Entertainment and Ireland's Subotica Entertainment. The footage was shot in 2009 largely under direction of Michael Radford, with Sebastián Grousset taking over the last days of the filming. A protracted and convoluted legal litigation over the film's finances between Gheko Films' Alejandra Frade and Michael Radford ensued. Shooting locations in Andalusia included Guadix, Andújar, and Montoro.

Litigation 
The legal ruckus involved crossed accusations of "libel, lies and career-wrecking malice". According to Radford, Gheko Films' Alejandra Frade refused to sign contracts that may have allowed the film to get funding from the Irish Film Board and the UK Film Council, imperiling the remuneration of the British crew. The Spanish ICAA banned the distribution of the film for 2 years, filing a lawsuit for injuriousness. Alejandra Frade peddled a legal complaint against ICAA director Ignasi Guardans for alleged prevarication, bribery and influence peddling. Gheko Films also peddled another lawsuit against Spanish Under-Secretary for Culture . 

After the legal battle turned in favour of Frade, ICAA handed the film its certification in December 2012. In a pyrrhic win, Frade managed to release her cut of the film in 2013, whereas Radford refused to have his name credited, also claiming that Frade was assembling a "rogue film", lamenting that [the film's production] "has been the saddest experience of my life and extremely damaging to me professionally".

Release 
After being stuck in a post-production hell for years, the film made its world premiere at the Málaga Film Festival on 25 April 2013. It was released theatrically in Spain on 10 May 2013.

Reception 
Carlos Marañón of Cinemanía rated the film 3½ out of 5 stars, considering that despite glaring continuity editing issues, the film works.

Mirito Torreiro of Fotogramas rated The Mule 3 out of 5 stars, highlighting Mario Casas as the best thing about it, while citing the film's "much improvable" writing as a negative point.

Accolades 

|-
| rowspan = "2" align = "center" | 2014 || 1st Feroz Awards || Best Actor || Mario Casas ||  || align = "center" | 
|-
| 28th Goya Awards || Best Original Score || Óscar Navarro ||  || 
|}

Notes

See also 
 List of Spanish films of 2013

References

External links 
 The Mule at ICAA's Catálogo de Cinespañol

Spanish romantic drama films
British romantic drama films
Irish romantic drama films
2010s Spanish films
2010s British films
Spanish Civil War films
2010s Spanish-language films
Films shot in the province of Jaén (Spain)
Films shot in the province of Granada